{{Automatic taxobox
| image = Ligularia sibirica-Ligulaire de Sibérie.JPG
| image_caption = Ligularia sibirica
| display_parents = 2
| taxon = Ligularia
| authority = Cass. 1816, conserved name, not Duval 1809 (Saxifragaceae)
| type_species = L. sibirica
| synonyms =
 Erythrochaete Siebold & Zucc.
 Cyathocephalum Nakai
 Senecillis]' Gaertn.
|synonyms_ref = 
}}Ligularia (leopard plant) is a genus of Old World herbaceous perennial plants in the groundsel tribe within the sunflower family. They have yellow or orange composite flower heads with brown or yellow central disc florets, and are native to damp habitats mostly in central and eastern Asia, with a few species from Europe. There are about 120 to 140 species in the genus, and over half are endemic to China. The name Ligularia, from the Latin for "strap", refers to the shape of the ray florets.

Some species and cultivars are cultivated as ornamentals.  Ligularia dentata ‘Britt Marie Crawford’  Ligularia x hessei (Ligularia dentata x Ligularia wilsoniana) 'Gregynog Gold' and Ligularia przewalskii 'The Rocket' have gained the Royal Horticultural Society's Award of Garden Merit. They are best grown in fertile, moist soil and full sun, with some shade at midday.
 Species

 Ligularia abakanica 
 Ligularia achyrotricha 
 Ligularia afghanica 
 Ligularia alatipes 
 Ligularia alpigena 
 Ligularia altaica 
 Ligularia alticola 
 Ligularia altissima 
 Ligularia amplexicaulis 
 Ligularia angusta 
 Ligularia anoleuca 
 Ligularia atkinsonii 
 Ligularia atroviolacea 
 Ligularia biceps 
 Ligularia botryodes 
 Ligularia brassicoides 
 Ligularia bucovinensis 
 Ligularia cacaliiformis 
 Ligularia caloxantha 
 Ligularia calthifolia 
 Ligularia carpatica 
 Ligularia chalybea 
 Ligularia chekiangensis 
 Ligularia chimiliensis 
 Ligularia confertiflora 
 Ligularia coreana 
 Ligularia cremanthodioides 
 Ligularia cuneata 
 Ligularia curvisquama 
 Ligularia cyathiceps 
 Ligularia cymbulifera 
 Ligularia cymosa 
 Ligularia dentata 
 Ligularia dictyoneura 
 Ligularia discoidea 
 Ligularia dolichobotrys 
 Ligularia duciformis 
 Ligularia dux 
 Ligularia eriocaulis 
 Ligularia euryphylla 
 Ligularia fangiana 
 Ligularia fargesii 
 Ligularia fauriei 
 Ligularia fischeri 
 Ligularia franchetiana 
 Ligularia ghatsukupa 
 Ligularia glauca 
 Ligularia heterophylla 
 Ligularia hodgsonii 
 Ligularia hookeri 
 Ligularia hopeiensis 
 Ligularia ianthochaeta 
 Ligularia intermedia 
 Ligularia jacquemontiana 
 Ligularia jaluensis 
 Ligularia jamesii 
 Ligularia japonica 
 Ligularia kaialpina 
 Ligularia kanaitzensis 
 Ligularia kangtingensis 
 Ligularia karataviensis 
 Ligularia kareliniana 
 Ligularia kingiana 
 Ligularia knorringiana 
 Ligularia kojimae 
 Ligularia konkalingensis 
 Ligularia lamarum 
 Ligularia lanipes 
 Ligularia lankongensis 
 Ligularia lapathifolia 
 Ligularia latihastata 
 Ligularia latipes 
 Ligularia leveillei 
 Ligularia liatroides 
 Ligularia lidjiangensis 
 Ligularia limprichtii 
 Ligularia lingiana 
 Ligularia longifolia 
 Ligularia longihastata 
 Ligularia macrodonta 
 Ligularia macrophylla 
 Ligularia melanocephala 
 Ligularia melanothyrsa 
 Ligularia microcardia 
 Ligularia microcephala 
 Ligularia mongolica 
 Ligularia muliensis 
 Ligularia myriocephala Ligularia nanchuanica Ligularia narynensis 
 Ligularia nelumbifolia Ligularia nyingchiensis Ligularia odontomanes 
 Ligularia oligonema 
 Ligularia pachycarpa 
 Ligularia palmatifida 
 Ligularia paradoxa 
 Ligularia parvifolia 
 Ligularia pavlovii 
 Ligularia persica 
 Ligularia petelotii 
 Ligularia petiolaris 
 Ligularia phoenicochaeta 
 Ligularia phyllocolea 
 Ligularia platyglossa 
 Ligularia pleurocaulis 
 Ligularia potaninii 
 Ligularia przewalskii 
 Ligularia pterodonta Ligularia purdomii 
 Ligularia pyrifolia 
 Ligularia retusa Ligularia robusta 
 Ligularia rockiana 
 Ligularia ruficoma 
 Ligularia rumicifolia 
 Ligularia sachalinensis 
 Ligularia sagitta 
 Ligularia schizopetala 
 Ligularia schmidtii Ligularia sibirica Ligularia sichotensis 
 Ligularia songarica Ligularia splendens 
 Ligularia stenocephala 
 Ligularia stenoglossa 
 Ligularia subsagittata 
 Ligularia subspicata 
 Ligularia talassica 
 Ligularia tenuicaulis 
 Ligularia tenuipes 
 Ligularia thomsonii 
 Ligularia thyrsoidea 
 Ligularia tissulaginea 
 Ligularia tongkyukensis 
 Ligularia tongolensis 
 Ligularia transversifolia 
 Ligularia trichocephala 
 Ligularia tsangchanensis 
 Ligularia veitchiana 
 Ligularia vellerea 
 Ligularia villosa Ligularia virgaurea 
 Ligularia vorobievii 
 Ligularia wilsoniana 
 Ligularia xanthotricha 
 Ligularia yoshizoeana 
 Ligularia yunnanensis 
 Ligularia zhouquensis''

References

External links

 
Asteraceae genera
Taxa named by Henri Cassini